Newham London Borough Council is elected every four years.

Political control
The first election to the council was held in 1964, initially operating as a shadow authority before the new system came into full effect the following year. Political control of the council has been held since 1964 by the following parties:

Leadership
Prior to 2002, politicial leadership was provided by the leader of the council. The leaders from 1985 to 2002 were:

In 2002 the council changed to having directly elected mayors. The mayors since 2002 have been:

Council elections
 1964 Newham London Borough Council election
 1968 Newham London Borough Council election
 1971 Newham London Borough Council election
 1974 Newham London Borough Council election
 1978 Newham London Borough Council election (boundary changes took place but the number of seats remained the same)
 1982 Newham London Borough Council election
 1986 Newham London Borough Council election
 1990 Newham London Borough Council election
 1994 Newham London Borough Council election (boundary changes took place but the number of seats remained the same)
 1998 Newham London Borough Council election
 2002 Newham London Borough Council election (boundary changes took place but the number of seats remained the same)
 2006 Newham London Borough Council election
 2010 Newham London Borough Council election
 2014 Newham London Borough Council election
 2018 Newham London Borough Council election
 2022 Newham London Borough Council election

Borough result maps

By-election results

1964-1968
There were no by-elections.

1968-1971

1971-1974

1974-1978

1978-1982

The by-election was called following the death of Cllr. Henry E. L. Ronan.

The by-election was called following the resignation of Cllr. Joseph C. Taylor.

The by-election was called following the resignation of Cllr. Herbert G. Simpson.

The by-election was called following the death of Cllr. Sidney A. Elson.

The by-election was called following the resignation of Cllr. John Clark.

1982-1986

The by-election was called following the resignation of Cllr. Michael T. Foley. Liberal Party stood as Liberal Alliance Focus Team.

The by-election was called following the resignations of Cllrs. Ann Winfield and Rif Winfield. Liberal Party stood as Liberal Focus Team.

The by-election was called following the resignation of Cllr. Maurice Sampson.

1986-1990

The by-election was called following the resignation death of Cllr. John Wilson.

The by-election was called following the resignation of Cllr. Colin M. Copus.

The by-election was called following the death of Cllr. Thomas Nolan.

The by-election was called following the resignation of Cllr. Joseph C. Sambrano.

1990-1994

The by-election was called following the resignation of Cllr. David P. Kellaway.

The by-election was called following the disqualification of Cllr. Pamela Furness.

The by-election was called following the resignation of Cllr. Pallavi B. Patel.

The by-election was called following the resignation of Cllrs. Patricia A. Heron and Bobby Thomas.

The by-election was called following the resignation of Cllr. Sean Cadogan.

The by-election was called following the resignation of Cllr. Kevin Gillespie.

The by-election was called following the resignation of Cllr. Dominic G. Gough.

1994-1998

The by-election was called following the death of Cllr. Thomas A. Jenkinson.

The by-election was called following the resignation of Cllr. Glynis A. Carpenter.

The by-election was called following the resignation of Cllr. Christopher B. Allen.

The by-election was called following the resignation of Cllr. Dennis R. Horwood.

The by-election was called following the resignation of Cllr. Stephen C. Timms.

The by-election was called following the death of Cllr. Theodore L. Etherden.

The by-election was called following the resignation of Cllr. Judith A. Jorsling.

1998-2002

The by-election was called following the death of Cllr. William A. Chapman.

The by-election was called following the death of Cllr. Harbans S. Jabbal.

The by-election was called following the death of Cllr. James G. Newstead.

The by-election was called following the resignation of Cllr. Christopher T. Rackley.

The by-election was called following the death of Cllr. Maureen Knight.

2002-2006
There were no by-elections.

2006-2010

The by-election was called following the death of Cllr Simon P. Tucker.

2010-2014
There were no by-elections.

2014-2018

The by-election was called following the death of Cllr Alec Kellaway.

The by-election was called following the disqualification due to non-attendance of Cllr Charlene McLean

The by-election was called following the death of Cllr Charity Fibresima

  

The by-election was called following the resignation of Councillor Ellie Robinson to accept a job with the Mayor of London, Sadiq Khan.

2018-2022

The by-election was called following the resignation of Cllr Veronica Oakeshott.

The by-election was called following the resignation of Cllr Julianne Marriott.

2022-2026

References